George "Twyber" Travers (9 June 1877 – 26 December 1945) was a Welsh international hooker who played club rugby for Pill Harriers and Newport Rugby Football Club. He won 25 caps for Wales between 1903 and 1911.

Travers is seen as one of the rugby union's first specialist hookers. Specialism in a forward position was unusual during the early history of rugby mainly due to the scrummaging rule, but Travers's ability shone through and as part of a seven-man pack was important in the Welsh wins against England in 1903 and in the famous Match of the Century victory against the All Blacks in 1905. Travers originally played club rugby for the Newport Docks-based side Pill Harriers, though he would later spend two seasons with Newport in 1901/02 and 1910/11.

International career

Travers was first capped, at centre, making his debut against England in January, 1903 while playing for Pill Harriers. Although it was unusual at the time for unfashionable "second-class" clubs to supply international players, it was not unprecedented, with valley teams such as Treorchy and Treherbert supplying several forwards. He would play for Wales a further 24 times including games against the original New Zealand team, South Africa and Australia. In 1908 Travers was awarded the Welsh captaincy against Scotland at Swansea a game Wales would win 6-5, though this was the only time he would hold this honour. His only international points were against the Australian Wallabies, a game Wales won 9-6, though it has been later recognised by both sides that Travers dropped the ball before going over the line and the try should not have counted.

International matches played
Wales
   1908
  1903, 1905, 1906, 1907, 1908, 1909
  1908, 1911
  1903, 1905, 1906, 1907, 1908, 1909, 1911
  1905
  1903, 1905, 1906, 1907, 1908, 1909, 1911
  1906

Bibliography

References

1877 births
1945 deaths
Mountain Ash RFC players
Newport RFC players
Rugby union players from Newport, Wales
Pill Harriers RFC players
Monmouthshire County RFC players
Rugby union hookers
Wales international rugby union players
Wales rugby union captains
Welsh rugby union players